St. Luke's Lutheran Church Cemetery, also known as Sandy Creek Cemetery, is a historic church cemetery located near Tyro, Davidson County, North Carolina.   It is associated with the St. Luke's Lutheran Church, founded in 1790 as Swicegood Meeting House. It contains approximately 300 burials, with the earliest gravestone dated to 1804.   It features a unique collection of folk gravestones by local stonecutters erected in Davidson County in the late-18th and first half of the 19th centuries.

It was listed on the National Register of Historic Places in 1984.

References

External links
 
 
 

Cemeteries on the National Register of Historic Places in North Carolina
Cemeteries in Davidson County, North Carolina
National Register of Historic Places in Davidson County, North Carolina
Lutheran cemeteries in the United States